The 2017 Milton SC season was the fourth season in the club's participation in the Canadian Soccer League. They began the season on May 27, 2017 in an away match against FC Vorkuta. The season concluded with Milton securing a postseason berth by finishing sixth in the standings. In the preliminary rounds of the playoffs they were defeated by the York Region Shooters.

Competitions

Canadian Soccer League

First Division

Results summary

Results by round

Matches

Statistics

Goals and assists 
Correct as of November 10, 2017

References 

Milton SC
Milton SC